Calogero is the name of the second studio album recorded by the French singer and songwriter Calogero. It was released in 2002 and achieved a great success, notably when the next album, 3, came out.

Album information

After a small success of the previous album, Au Milieu des autres, Calogero decided to release a new album, with an eponymous title. For this album, Calogero composed almost all the music, while famous artists in France wrote the lyrics. Françoise Hardy, Lionel Florence and Gioacchino, Calogero's brother, participated in the writing of at least one song. A hidden track is also available after the 11th song, "L'Européen".

The album had a very long chart trajectory in the French and Belgian (Wallonia) albums charts. Indeed, the success of the next album, 3, made Calogero able to remain for respectively 104 and 94 weeks on the charts. In Belgium the album hit #2 in its second week, but in France, it reached its peak position, #3, almost two years after its release.

In France, four singles were released from this album ; however, only the second one, "En Apesanteur", had success, peaking at #13 for two weeks on the French Singles Chart and hitting Gold status. The three other singles achieved a minor success : "Aussi libre que moi" reached #35, "Tien an Men" #43, and "Prendre racine" #39.

The CD was re-issued in 2003 with a second CD containing five tracks.

Track listing

First release, 2002

 CD

1 Hidden track

Second release, 2003

 Additional CD

Credits

Editions

 Editions Impek / Atletico Music : tracks 1, 2, 3, 9 + hidden track
 Francis Dreyfus Music (cat. Silex) : track 4
 Editions Impek / Atletico Music / Sony ATV Music Publishing : track 5, 6, 8, 10
 Editions Kundali / Editions Impek : track 7
 Editions Impek / Atletico Music / Editions Françaises : track 11

Personnel

 Produced by Pierre Jaconelli
 Guitars : Pierre Jaconelli, Olivier Marly and Michel Aymé
 Bass : Calogero
 Drum kit : Magnus Perrson
 Keyboards, programmations and piano : Jean-Pierre Pilot
Except : "Tien An Men" : Yannick Fonderie
 Background vocals on "Prouver l'amour" : Yvette Hammond
 Arrangements and strings direction : 
 "Aussi libre que moi" : Olivier Schultheis
 "Tien An Men" and "À la gueule des noyés" : Stanislas Renoult
 Recorded by Erwin Autrique at studio ICP
 Mixed by Pete Schwier, assisted by Jean-Paul Gonnot, at studio Plus XXX
Except : "Aussi libre que moi" : Erwin Autrique at studio ICP
 Preproduction : Jean-Pierre Pilot, Calogero and Pierre Jaconelli
 Mastering : Miles Showell, at Metropolis Studio
 Artistic direction : Caroline Molko
 Executive producer : Sandrine Lebars
 Photos : Kate Barry
 Design : Agnès B. / l'Eclaireur
 Artwork : Autrement le design

Charts

Weekly charts

Year-end charts

Certifications

References

2002 albums
Calogero (singer) albums